Gretchen the Greenhorn is an American silent film released in 1916. The film stars Dorothy Gish as a Dutch girl who emigrates to America to be with her father; they become entangled with a counterfeiting ring.  Set in an immigrant section of an American city, the film avoids heavy stereotyping, according to the booklet accompanying the DVD release notes.

Cast
 Dorothy Gish as Gretchen Van Houck
 Ralph Lewis as Jan Van Houck
 Eugene Pallette as Rodgers
 Elmo Lincoln as Mystery Ship Captain
 Frank Bennett as Pietro
 Georgie Stone as Little Nicky Garrity
 Kate Bruce as Widow Garrity

Preservation status
The only known complete copy was donated by Galen Biery to the Hollywood Studio Museum in 1991. Fully restored, it was presented at a UCLA film festival in 1993 and is in the Museum of Modern Art and UCLA Film and Television Archives.

Home media
It is included in the 2004 DVD box set More Treasures from American Film Archives, 1894-1931.

References

External links

1916 films
1916 crime drama films
American crime drama films
American silent feature films
American black-and-white films
Films directed by Chester Franklin
Films directed by Sidney Franklin
Films with screenplays by Bernard McConville
Surviving American silent films
1910s English-language films
1910s American films
Silent American drama films